Levana is an ancient Roman goddess.

Levana may also refer to:
 brand name of Cinazepam
 Hebrew feminine name. Notable people with the name include:
Levana Finkelstein (born 1947), Israeli actress and sculptress
Levana Kirschenbaum, American restaurateur, caterer, cooking teacher and food writer
Levana Moshon  (born 1952), Israeli writer, journalist, teacher and children's storyteller
Queen Levana from novels by Marissa Mayer, such as Winter, Cinder, The Lunar Chronicles, etc.

See also

Levanna